Francis Smith of Warwick (1672–1738) was an English master-builder and architect, much involved in the construction of country houses in the Midland counties of England.  Smith of Warwick may refer also to his brothers, or his son.

Architectural work

The county town of Warwick had been devastated by a fire in September 1694, and the projects involved in its rebuilding gave the Smith brothers their first prominence, which they retained for decades by a universal reputation for scrupulous honesty and competence. Howard Colvin, plotting their known commissions on a map, remarked that nearly all of them lay within a fifty-mile radius of their mason's yard, the "Marble House" in Warwick.

The antiquary the Hon. Daines Barrington noted in 1784, after viewing several Smith of Warwick houses, found "all of them convenient and handsome" despite changes in taste. Colvin summarised the elements by which a Smith house is easily recognizable: three storeys, with the central three bays emphasized by a slight projection or recession; uniform fenestration with exterior detail confined to keystones, architraves, quoins and a balustraded parapet, which was the most significant modernisation of a formula derived in essence from the late seventeenth-century model typified by Belton House. In the plans there was invariably a hall backed by a saloon in the centre, with a staircase set to one side. In spite of some splendid effects achieved by plasterwork and joinery, Colvin noted that "the spatial effects are simple and unenterprising".

Four exceptional houses did not conform to these conventions. They were Kedleston (demolished and replaced by the celebrated Robert Adam house); Chicheley Hall with William Kent, doubtless in part the design of its owner Sir John Chester, and his virtuosi friends; Stoneleigh Abbey, "a somewhat inept attempt to use a giant order in the grand baroque manner" (Colvin) and Sutton Scarsdale (stripped of its interiors in the 1920s), where Colvin, comparing its assurance with Stoneleigh's "gauche" crowded windows and "leggy pilasters", suspected some intervention by James Gibbs.

Andor Gomme has identified several churches which had Francis Smith’s architectural input, of which four survive in use with Smith’s contribution reasonably intact; namely All Saints, Gainsborough, Lincs. (all except tower), St Nicholas Alcester, Warks. (nave), All Saints, Lamport, Northants. (chancel) and St Botolphs Sibston, Leics.  The first two, with their Corinthian and Doric columns respectively and plastered ceilings, display Smith’s adoption of the Palladian style, as influenced by Gibbs.

Family
William Smith of Warwick (1661–1724), master builder trained as a bricklayer, was brother to Francis Smith: the brothers, who often worked in partnership and with the third brother Richard, were sons of a bricklayer and master builder, Francis Smith, of The Wergs, near Tettenhall, Staffordshire. By the time of William's death in 1724 they had become the most prominent designers and builders of houses in the Midlands.

Francis joined his brother William in the reconstruction of St. Mary's Church, Warwick, but later oversaw the project of the new courthouse. Francis served on the Town Corporation in the 1720s and was the head of maintenance during the 1730s until he died in 1738.

William Smith of Warwick (1705–1747) was the next generation in the firm, son of Francis. The business passed to William and David Hiorn.

Craftsmen

He was a major employer, and some of his craftsmen were individually credited on a lead plaque formerly at Sutton Scarsdale:

Thomas Eborall, joiner
Joshua Needham, plasterer
Edward Poynton of Nottingham, stone carver
John Wilkes, door furniture

Another craftsman and architect who worked under Smith was William Baker of Audlem, who was employed as a carpenter by Smith at Ditchley in Oxfordshire in 1727, and later developed an extensive architectural practice in Shropshire and Staffordshire
A further architect and builder associated with the Smiths was Abraham Hayward, who came from Whitchurch, where Smith had built St Alkmund's Church. The Smiths employed Hayward on the re-building of St Peter at Arches Church, Lincoln, where Hayward was to stay and work as an architect.

Buildings (designed or worked on)

Acton Round Hall
All Saints Church, Gainsborough, Lincolnshire 
All Saints Church, Lamport, Northamptonshire
Aston Hall, Birmingham 1735, attributed
Buntingsdale Hall, Shropshire c.1721, attributed to John Prince and Smith
Calke Abbey, Derbyshire 1727 with James Gibbs
Chicheley Hall with William Kent, 1719–1723
Chillington Hall, Staffordshire
Cottesbrooke Hall, attributed
Davenport House, Worfield, Shropshire c. 1727
Derby Cathedral, with James Gibbs, 1723–1725
Ditchley Park, Oxfordshire
Dudmaston Hall, 1695–1701
Fawsley Hall, Northamptonshire
Hereford Cathedral
Heythrop Hall, 1707–1713
Kelmarsh Hall with James Gibbs, 1732
Kemerton Court, attributed
Kirtlington House
Lamport Hall c.1732
Leeswood Hall, Leeswood, Flintshire

Locko Park, Derbyshire 1725–1730
Mason Croft, Stratford upon Avon, Warwickshire.
Mawley Hall, Shropshire 1730
Melbourne Hall, Derbyshire
Ombersley Court, Worcestershire
Preston-on-the-Weald Moors Hospital, Shropshire, 1720–1726, attributed
Shardeloes
St Alkmund's Church, Whitchurch, Shropshire
St Botolph's Church, Sibson, Leicestershire
St Mary’s Priory Church, Monmouth, 1732
St Modwen's Church, Burton upon Trent
St NIcholas Church, Alcester, Warks, 1729
St Peter at Arches Church, Lincoln c1720-24
Stanford Hall, Leicestershire
Stanwick Hall, Northamptonshire
Stoneleigh Abbey, Warwickshire 1714–1728
Sutton Scarsdale House, Derbyshire
Umberslade Hall, 1695–1700
Warwick Court House

References
Howard Colvin, A Biographical Dictionary of British Architects 1600–1840, 3rd ed. (Yale University Press) 1995, s.v. "Smith, Francis".
Andor Gomme (2000), Smith of Warwick. Francis Smith, Architect and Master-Builder

Notes

External links
Posthumous bust by Michael Rysbrack, 1741, from the Radcliffe Camera.

1672 births
1738 deaths
18th-century English architects
People from Warwick
Architects from Warwickshire